Rasmus Heisterberg (born 12 December 1974) is a Danish screenwriter. 

Heisterberg was born in Copenhagen, Denmark and attended the National Film School of Denmark. He was a writer on The Girl with the Dragon Tattoo (2009) A Royal Affair (2012).

References

External links 

 Rasmus Heisterberg on IMDb
 Rasmus Heisterberg on the Danish Film Institute 
 Rasmus Heisterberg on the British Film Institute 

1974 births
Living people
Danish male screenwriters
People from Copenhagen
Silver Bear for Best Screenplay winners